Munsvattnet is a small village in Strömsund Municipality, Sweden, to the west of Lars-Thomas, with a population of 108.

External links
 Maps, weather, and airports

Populated places in Strömsund Municipality
Jämtland